Calvary Murrieta Christian Schools (CMCS) is a private preschool to 8th grade (9th to 12th grade (1993-2019) Christian school education system in Murrieta, California, US, which was founded by the Calvary Chapel of Murrieta Church. The school is accredited by the Western Association of Schools and Colleges (WASC 7–12) and the Association of Christian Schools International (ACSI 7–12). CMCS also holds membership in the Association of Christian Schools International (ACSI) and the California Interscholastic Federation (CIF). 

In May 2019, it was announced by Brian Bell, pastor of Calvary Chapel Murrieta, that Calvary Murrieta Christian Schools’ high school would close indefinitely. The reason given was increased financial difficulties, along with a decrease in the number of students enrolling in the school.

Athletics

Junior High
 Boys Football (8-Man)
 Girls Volleyball
 Coed Cross Country
 Cheer
 Boys Baseball
 Girls Softball
 Boys Basketball
 Girls Basketball
 Coed Soccer
 Coed Golf
 Coed Track

High school
The high school program closed when the High School, itself, closed in 2019.

 Boys Football (11-Man)
 Girls Volleyball
 Coed Cross Country
 Cheer
 Girls Soccer
 Boys Soccer
 Girls Basketball
 Boys Basketball
 Boys Baseball
 Girls Softball
 Coed Track
 Boys Volleyball
 Coed Golf

Arts

Music
 Jazz Band
 Intermediate Band
 Symphonic Band
 Warrior Pep Band
 Show Choir

Theatre Arts
 Introduction to Drama
 Advanced Drama
 Theatre Productions

Visual Arts
 Ceramics
 Fine Art
 Journalism/Yearbook
 Photography

References

Christian schools in California
Education in Riverside County, California
Private high schools in California
Private middle schools in California
Private elementary schools in California
Murrieta, California